Duarte is a northeastern province which comprises one of the 32 provinces of the Dominican Republic. It is divided into 7 municipalities and its capital city is San Francisco de Macorís. It is bordered by the provinces of María Trinidad Sánchez and Samaná to the east, Monte Plata and Sánchez Ramírez to the south, La Vega and Hermanas Mirabal to the west and Espaillat to the north. It is named after Juan Pablo Duarte, the founder of the Dominican Republic.

It was created in 1896 as a district (an old country subdivision) with the name Distrito Pacificador but the Constitution of 1907 changed the category to province. In 1925 its name was changed to Duarte.

Geography 
The province has a total area of 1,605.35 km2. It has 3.3% of the area of the Dominican Republic and it is ranked as the 13th (out of 31 plus the National District) largest province.

History
The province is named in honor of the country's founding father Juan Pablo Duarte. In the 18th century, a chapel for the Lady of Santa Ana was founded, built in what is now the Rincón San Francisco de Macorís. For the nineteenth century, it was admitted to the category of Parish to later become the District of La Vega. When the independence of the Dominican Republic was proclaimed, Duarte was the first town in the Cibao to rise up in favor of the Puerta del Conde. After the republic had been established, Duarte became a part of La Vega.

In 1896 San Francisco became the head of the Peacekeeping District —this name was given in honor of President Ulises Heureaux, who was given the title of Peacemaker of the Homeland. In 1907 it became a province with the same as Peacemaker. In 1925 the name of the Pacifying Province was changed to the Duarte Province, in honor of the Father of the nation.

Municipalities 

The province as of June 20, 2006 is divided into the following municipalities (municipios) and municipal districts (distrito municipal - D.M.) within them:

San Francisco de Macorís, head municipality of the province
Cenoví (D.M.)
Jaya (D.M.)
La Peña (D.M.)
Presidente Don Antonio Guzmán Fernández (D.M.)
Arenoso
El Aguacate (D.M.)
Las Coles (D.M.)
Castillo
Eugenio María de Hostos
Sabana Grande (D.M.)
Las Guáranas
Pimentel
Villa Riva
Agua Santa del Yuna (D.M.)
Barraquito (D.M.)
Cristo Rey de Guaraguao (D.M.)
Guáranas Arriba (D.M.)

Population 
The following is a sortable table of the municipalities and municipal districts with population figures as of the 2014 estimate. Urban population are those living in the seats (cabeceras literally heads) of municipalities or of municipal districts. Rural population are those living in the districts (Secciones literally sections) and neighborhoods (Parajes literally places) outside them. The population figures are from the 2014 population estimate.

For comparison with the municipalities and municipal districts of other provinces see the list of municipalities and municipal districts of the Dominican Republic.

References

External links

  Oficina Nacional de Estadística, Statistics Portal of the Dominican Republic
  Oficina Nacional de Estadística, Maps with administrative division of the provinces of the Dominican Republic, downloadable in PDF format

 
Provinces of the Dominican Republic
States and territories established in 1844